D11, D.XI, D XI or D-11 may refer to:

Ships 
 ARA La Argentina (D-11), a 1981 destroyer of the Argentine navy
 HMAS Vampire (D11), a 1956 destroyer of the Royal Australian Navy
 HMS Impulsive (D11), a 1937 United Kingdom Royal Navy destroyer which saw service during World War II
 Nueva Esparta, a Venezuelan Navy Nueva Esparta-class destroyer

Aircraft
 Albatros D.XI, a 1918 German single-seat fighter biplane
 Fokker D.XI, a 1923 Dutch single-seat fighter aircraft
 Jodel D.11, a two-seat French commercial aircraft

Locomotives 
 Bavarian D XI, an 1895 German saturated steam locomotive model
 GS&WR Class D11, a steam locomotive of Ireland
 LNER Class D11, a class of British 4-4-0 locomotives introduced in 1919 by the Great Central Railway

Medicine 
 ATC code D11, Other dermatological preparations, a subgroup of the Anatomical Therapeutic Chemical Classification System
 Warthin's tumor, ICD-10 code

Other uses
 DXi, DirectX Instrument plugins
 D11 motorway (Czech Republic)
 DirecTV-11, a DirecTV satellite
 Dublin 11, a Dublin, Ireland postal district
 Slav Defence, 3.Nf3, Encyclopaedia of Chess Openings code
 Colorado Springs School District 11 (D-11)
 Caterpillar D11, a large conventional bulldozer
 London's Metropolitan Police Specialist Firearms Command, formerly known as D11

See also
11D (disambiguation)